The Holy Saviour Church (Jezuitský kostol) also called the Jesuit Church, is an originally protestant church from the 17th century on the Franciscan Square in the Old Town of Bratislava, Slovakia.  Today, the church belongs to the Society of Jesus, known as the Jesuit Order.

Location 
It is located next to the Old Town Hall (Bratislava).

History 
The church was built from 1636 to 1638 as a place of worship for the protestants as there was a growing number of protestants of German ethnicity in the city. By the King's decree the church could not resemble a Roman-Catholic house of worship in any way; so it was built without a spire, presbytery and lacking entrance from the main street.

Organ (Rieger 1924, opus 2273)

fully pneumatic action
 Couplers:
 III/II, III/I, II/I, III/P, II/P, I/P
 Super-octave couplers: Super III, Super III/II, Super III/I, Super III/P, Super II, Super II/I
 Sub-octave couplers: Sub III, Sub III/I, Sub II/I
 2 combinations, Crescendo, Tutti, reeds off

See also 
 Old Town, Bratislava
 History of Bratislava
 List of Jesuit sites

References 

Roman Catholic churches in Bratislava
Jesuit churches in Slovakia
17th-century Roman Catholic church buildings in Slovakia